Laura Robson was the defending champion, but withdrew before the event started. 

Ayano Shimizu won the title, defeating Abbie Myers in the final, 6–3, 7–5.

Seeds

Draw

Finals

Top half

Bottom half

References
Main Draw

Kurume U.S.E Cup - Singles
Kurume Best Amenity Cup